Goniobranchus mandapamensis is a species of colourful sea slug, a dorid nudibranch, a marine gastropod mollusk in the family Chromodorididae.

Distribution
This species was described from India.

References

Chromodorididae
Gastropods described in 1999